Purkinje cell protein 4 is a protein that in humans is encoded by the PCP4 gene. Also known as PEP-19, PCP4 is a 7.6 kDa protein with an IQ-motif that binds to calmodulin (CaM). PCP4 is abundant in Purkinje cells of the cerebellum, and plays an important role in synaptic plasticity.

Function 

PCP4 knockout mice have been reported to exhibit impaired locomotor learning and markedly altered synaptic plasticity in cerebellar Purkinje neurons. PCP4 accelerates both the association and dissociation of calcium (Ca2+) with calmodulin (CaM), which is postulated to influence the activity of CaM-dependent enzymes, especially CaM kinase II (CaMK-II).

References

Further reading